Cathy Glasson is an American nurse, union leader, and former candidate for Governor of Iowa, running in the 2018 Democratic primary. She is President of SEIU Local 199 in Iowa and has received support from the union. Glasson lost the primary to businessman Fred Hubbell, receiving 20.5% of the vote to Hubbell's 55.5%.

She supports raising the minimum wage and a Medicare for All plan.

References

External links
Official site
SEIU Local 199

People from Iowa
Iowa Democrats
1958 births
Living people